The northern Western Ghats vine snake (Ahaetulla borealis) is a species of tree snake endemic to the northern Western Ghats of India.

Taxonomy 
It was formerly considered conspecific with A. nasuta, which is now considered to only be endemic to Sri Lanka. A 2020 study found A. nasuta to be a species complex of A. nasuta sensu stricto as well as A. borealis, A. farnsworthi, A. isabellina, and A. malabarica.

Geographic range 
This species is one of the most widespread of Western Ghats Ahaetulla, ranging from Sirsi, Karnataka north to Matheran, Maharashtra. Near the southern edge of its range it is flanked by A. farnsworthi, from which it is likely separated by the Sharavathi River basin.

Habitat 
It is found in low-to-mid-elevation moist deciduous and semi-evergreen forests at a mean sea level of 300 – 750.

References 

borealis
Snakes of India
Snakes of Asia
Endemic fauna of the Western Ghats
Reptiles described in 2020